Maraña is a small village in Spain in the province of León, in the Picos de Europa, close to Asturias.

The major festival is August 15, the Festival of Our Lady of Riosol

See also

 Kingdom of León
 Leonese language

References

External links
Location of Maraña in Google maps
Information about the Refugio de Maraña, the only accommodation available for visitors to the village.
VIDEO: a montage of photos - church of our lady of Riosol, and shots of the mountains and surrounds, nothing inside the village

Towns in Spain
Municipalities in the Province of León
Picos de Europa